Dmitri Pavlovich Redkovich (born 15 January 1998) is a Russian football player. He plays for FC Chertanovo Moscow.

Club career
He made his debut in the Russian Professional Football League for FC Chertanovo Moscow on 20 July 2016 in a game against FC Torpedo Moscow. He made his Russian Football National League debut for FC Chertanovo Moscow on 17 July 2018 in a game against FC Rotor Volgograd.

References

External links
 Profile by Football National League

1998 births
Footballers from Moscow
Living people
Russian footballers
Association football defenders
FC Chertanovo Moscow players
FC Torpedo Moscow players
FC Metallurg Lipetsk players